Body is a 2015 Polish drama film directed by Małgorzata Szumowska. It was screened in the main competition section of the 65th Berlin International Film Festival where Szumowska won the Silver Bear for Best Director. The film also received the Golden Lions Award at the 2015 Gdynia Film Festival and the People's Choice Award at the 2016 European Film Awards.

Plot
Olga who struggles with anorexia is sent to psychiatric hospital by the Attorney, where she is treated by Anna - a therapist who believes herself to be able to communicate with ghosts. Anna insists that she has been in contact with Olga's dead mother and she asks the Attorney to participate in a séance.

Cast
Janusz Gajos as Attorney
Maja Ostaszewska as Anna
Justyna Suwala as Olga, attorney's daughter
Wladyslaw Kowalski as Władysław
Adam Woronowicz as director Zieliński
Tomasz Ziętek as attorney's assistant
Malgorzata Hajewska as Karol's mother
Ewa Kolasinska as a nurse
Ada Piekarska, as Ada
Ewa Dalkowska as the prosecutor's friend

Reception
On review aggregator website Rotten Tomatoes, the film has a 89% approval rating based on 9 reviews.

References

External links

2015 films
2015 drama films
European Film Awards winners (films)
Polish drama films
Films directed by Małgorzata Szumowska